Chris Anderson (born 6 April 1968) is an Australian retired high jumper. He competed at the 1995 World Championships and the 1996 Olympic Games without reaching the final.

His personal best jump is 2.28 metres, achieved in December 1994 in Perth.

References

1968 births
Living people
Australian male high jumpers
Athletes (track and field) at the 1996 Summer Olympics
Olympic athletes of Australia
20th-century Australian people
21st-century Australian people